Dean Zimmerman (born April 8, 1974) is an American film and television editor. He won an Primetime Emmy Award and was nominated for two more in the category Outstanding Picture Editing for his work on the television program Stranger Things. Zimmerman is also a member of the American Cinema Editors.

Selected filmography 
 Rush Hour 3 (2007)
 Jumper (2008)
 Night at the Museum: Battle of the Smithsonian (2009)
 Date Night (2010)
 Gulliver's Travels (2010)
 Real Steel (2011)
 The Watch (2012)
 The Internship (2013)
 This Is Where I Leave You (2014)
 Night at the Museum: Secret of the Tomb (2014)
 The Last Witch Hunter (2015)
 The Darkest Minds (2018)
 Holmes & Watson (2018)
 Free Guy (2021)
 The Adam Project (2022)

References

External links 

1974 births
Living people
People from Los Angeles
American film editors
American television editors
Primetime Emmy Award winners
American twins
American Cinema Editors